Baki may refer to:

Places
 Baku, the capital of Azerbaijan
 Baki District of the Awdal region in Somalia
Baki town, Somaliland
 Baki, Afghanistan
 Baki, Sukoharjo, a subdistrict in Sukoharjo Regency, Jawa Tengah, Indonesia
 Baki people, a tribe from the Centre and East Provinces of Cameroon
 Baki language spoken on the island of Epi in Vanuatu
 Bąki (disambiguation), a Polish place-name
 A fictional country consisting of a small Pacific island north of Australia in Madeleine L'Engle's writing

People
 Baki, an 18th dynasty Ancient Egyptian prince buried in the Valley of the Queen QV72
 Bâkî, the pen name of Mahmud Abdülbâkî (1526-1600), Turkish poet of the Ottoman era
 Baki Davrak (born 1971), Turkish-German actor
 Baki İlkin (born 1943), Turkish diplomat
 Baki Mercimek (born 1982), Turkish footballer
 Mirza Baqi, 17th-century Mughal general

Fictional
 Baki, the main enemies in Drawn to Life and Drawn to Life: The Next Chapter
 Baki the Grappler, manga and anime about Baki, an unbelievably strong fighter
 Baki (Naruto), a character in the manga and anime Naruto

See also
 Abdul Baqi (disambiguation), Arabic theophoric name
 Bakkie (disambiguation)

Language and nationality disambiguation pages
Masculine given names
Arabic masculine given names
Turkish masculine given names